Elijah Sivister (11 December 1911 – 1993) was an English professional footballer who played in the Football League for Mansfield Town.

References

1911 births
1993 deaths
English footballers
Association football midfielders
English Football League players
Shirebrook Miners Welfare F.C. players
Mansfield Town F.C. players
Ollerton Colliery F.C. players
Ripley Town F.C. players
Ilkeston United F.C. players
Ashfield United F.C. players
Creswell Colliery F.C. players